Darqueze Derrell Dennard (born October 10, 1991) is an American football cornerback who is a free agent. He played college football at Michigan State and was drafted by the Cincinnati Bengals in the first round of the 2014 NFL Draft. Dennard won the Jim Thorpe Award in 2013 as the best defensive back in college football.

Early years
Dennard attended Twiggs County High School in Jeffersonville, Georgia, where he was a letterman in football, basketball, and track. In high school football, he played defensive back and wide receiver. As a senior, he had 40 receptions for 502 yards and 11 touchdowns on offense and 50 tackles and nine interceptions with two touchdowns on defense.

In track & field, Dennard competed as a sprinter. He was the runner-up in the 100-meter dash at the 2010 GHSA 1A State Championships, recording a personal-best time of 10.72 seconds.

Considered a two-star recruit by ESPN.com, Dennard was listed as the #166 wide receiver in the nation in 2010.

College career
Dennard accepted an athletic scholarship to attend Michigan State University, where he played for coach Mark Dantonio's Michigan State Spartans football team from 2010 to 2013.

As a true freshman in 2010, Dennard played in six games with two starts, missing five games due to injury. As a sophomore in 2011, he played in 11 games, missing two due to injury, he finished the season with 42 tackles and three interceptions, two which came against Georgia in the Outback Bowl. As a junior in 2012, he started all 13 games, recording 52 tackles and three interceptions. He was a first-team All-Big Ten selection. As a senior in 2013, he recorded 62 tackles and four interceptions and won the Jim Thorpe Award.

Professional career
Coming out of Michigan State, Dennard was a projected consensus first round pick by NFL draft experts and scouts. He received an invitation to the NFL combine as a top prospect and chose to only run the 40-yard dash, 20-yard dash, 10-yard dash, and perform the bench press. His time in the 40-yard dash (4.51) was the 13th best among all qualifying cornerbacks. NFL draft analyst Mike Mayock stated that Dennard would have to run a 4.45 or lower in the 40 to be considered a top ten overall pick. Dennard said that he was unable to complete all the combine drills due to unforeseen circumstances that limited him. On March 7, 2014, Dennard chose to participate at Michigan State's pro day, along with Max Bullough, Denicos Allen, Bennie Fowler,  Dan France, Fou Fonoti, Tyler Hoover, Andrew Maxwell, and nine other teammates. He opted to perform the vertical jump, broad jump, short shuttle, three-cone, and positional drills. He was ranked the top cornerback prospect in the draft by NFLDraftScout.com, CBSSports.com, and Sports Illustrated. He was also ranked the second best cornerback by NFL analyst Mike Mayock.

Cincinnati Bengals
The Cincinnati Bengals selected Dennard in the first round (24th overall) of the 2014 NFL Draft. He was the third cornerback taken in the 2014 NFL Draft, behind Justin Gilbert (8th overall, Browns) and Kyle Fuller (14th overall, Bears).

2014
On June 12, 2014, the Bengals signed Dennard to a four-year, $7.97 million contract that includes $6.47 million guaranteed and a signing bonus of $4.12 million.

Dennard joined a deep position group upon his arrival at training camp and competed with Adam Jones, Terence Newman, Leon Hall, and Dre Kirkpatrick for the job as the starting cornerback. Kirkpatrick, Newman, Hall, and Jones were all first round picks in the NFL draft themselves. Head coach Marvin Lewis named Dennard the Cincinnati Bengals' fifth cornerback on their depth chart behind Newman, Hall, Jones, and Kirkpatrick to start the regular season.

On September 14, 2014, Dennard made his professional regular season debut  for the Cincinnati Bengals and made one tackle during their 24–10 over the Atlanta Falcons. The next game, he recorded a season-high three solo tackles and made the first sack of his career on Tennessee Titans' quarterback Jake Locker during the Bengals' 33–7 victory. He saw limited playing time behind the host of a talented veterans during his rookie season and finished with only 17 combined tackles (14 solo), one pass deflection, and one sack in 14 games and zero starts.

The Bengals finished the 2014 season second in the AFC North with a 10-5-1 record. On January 4, 2015, Dennard appeared in his first career playoff game and collected two solo tackles and forced a fumble to set up a touchdown during a 10–26 AFC Wildcard loss to the Indianapolis Colts.

2015
He was named the fourth cornerback on their depth chart to begin the season, behind Jones, Kirkpatrick, and Hall.

In the Bengals' season-opener against the Oakland Raiders, Dennard recorded five solo tackles and defended a pass in a 33–13 victory. During a Week 4 matchup against the Kansas City Chiefs, he earned a season-high six combined tackles and deflected a pass, as the Bengals won their fourth consecutive game 36–21. On October 18, 2015, Dennard made a tackle and his first career interception after picking off a pass attempt by E. J. Manuel during the Bengals' 34–21 victory. On November 22, 2015, he earned the first start of his career and made two solo tackles in a 31-34 loss to the Arizona Cardinals. He started in place of Adam Jones who was unable to play due to a foot injury, but was unable to finish the contest after suffering a shoulder injury. On November 27, 2015, the Cincinnati Bengals officially placed him on injured reserve for the remainder of the season after discovering he had torn ligaments in his right shoulder that would require surgery. Dennard finished the 2015 season with 20 combined tackles (14 solo), three pass deflections, and an interception in ten games and one start.

2016
Dennard recovered from his shoulder surgery in time for Cincinnati Bengals' training camp and competed with Adam Jones, Dre Kirkpatrick, Josh Shaw, and rookie William Jackson III. Head coach Marvin Lewis named Dennard the third cornerback on the Bengals' depth chart to begin the season.

In Week 4, he made his first start of the season and recorded four tackles during a 22–7 win against the Miami Dolphins. On November 27, 2016, Dennard made a season-high eight combined tackles, as the Bengals 14–19 loss at the Baltimore Ravens. He finished the  season with 47 combined tackles (32 solo) and a pass deflection in 15 games and three starts.

2017

He competed with Adam Jones, Dre Kirkpatrick, Josh Shaw, and William Jackson III in training camp for the job as a starting cornerback. Dennard was named the Bengals' third cornerback on their depth chart behind Jones and Kirkpatrick for the second consecutive season.

He started the Cincinnati Bengals' season-opener against the Baltimore Ravens and collected four combined tackles and deflected a pass during their 0–20 loss. On September 24, 2017, Dennard recorded a career-high ten combined tackles and sacked Aaron Rodgers during a 24–27 loss to the Green Bay Packers. During a Week 4 matchup against the Cleveland Browns, he recorded four combined tackles and a sack on DeShone Kizer as the Bengals earned a 31–7 victory. On October 29, 2017, Dennard tied his career-high with ten combined tackles and defended a pass during a 24–23 win over the Indianapolis Colts He finished the season playing in all 16 games, starting six, recording a career-high 85 tackles, six passes defensed, and two interceptions.

2019
On March 21, 2019, Dennard re-signed with the Bengals. He was placed on the reserve/physically unable to perform list (PUP) on August 31, 2019. He was activated from the PUP list on October 18, 2019.

Atlanta Falcons
Dennard signed with his hometown Atlanta Falcons on August 3, 2020.

In Week 3 against the Chicago Bears, Dennard recorded his first interception as a Falcon during the 30–26 loss. He was placed on injured reserve on September 29, 2020 with a hamstring injury. He was activated on November 7, 2020.

Arizona Cardinals
On June 3, 2021, Dennard signed a one-year contract with the Arizona Cardinals. He was placed on injured reserve on August 30, 2021. He was released on September 9, 2021.

Indianapolis Colts
On October 20, 2021, Dennard was signed to the Indianapolis Colts practice squad. He was released on December 21, 2021.

New York Giants
On December 22, 2021, Dennard was signed to the New York Giants practice squad  and released on December 28, 2021.

San Francisco 49ers
On January 4, 2022, Dennard was signed to the San Francisco 49ers practice squad. His contract expired when the team's season ended on January 30, 2022. He re-signed with the team on March 25, 2022. He was released on August 15, 2022.

Personal life
Dennard's last name is pronounced as deh-NARD. This pronunciation differs from that of his second cousin, Alfonzo Dennard, due to a family dispute between Darqueze's mother and father. Alfonzo, who is a cornerback in the Arena Football League, pronounces his last name DENN-erd.

References

External links
Atlanta Falcons bio
Michigan State Spartans bio 

1991 births
Living people
People from Twiggs County, Georgia
People from Jeffersonville, Georgia
Players of American football from Georgia (U.S. state)
All-American college football players
American football cornerbacks
Michigan State Spartans football players
Cincinnati Bengals players
Atlanta Falcons players
Arizona Cardinals players
Indianapolis Colts players
New York Giants players
San Francisco 49ers players